The 1962 Italian Athletics Championships was the 52nd edition of the Italian Athletics Championships and were held in Naples (track & field events).

Champions

Men

Women

References

External links 
 Italian Athletics Federation

Italian Athletics Championships
Athletics
Italian Athletics Outdoor Championships
Athletics competitions in Italy